WTV may refer to:

Television
 WTV, a regional television channel in West-Flanders, Belgium, see the list of television stations in Belgium
 West TV, a free-to-air community television station based in Perth, Australia
 W Network, a Canadian cable channel aimed at women
 W Channel (Australia), an Australian television network originally focussed on female-oriented programming, now a drama channel
 World Television, a virtual communication agency
 Wakayama Telecasting Corporation, a Japanese terrestrial television station based in Wakayama

Other uses
 WTV (Windows Recorded TV Show), a Windows  video file format